Robert Finke  (born November 6, 1999) is an American swimmer. He won two gold medals for the United States in the 2020 Summer Olympics: the men's 800-meter and 1500-meter freestyle swims.

Finke is known to his friends by the nickname, Bobby. He currently swims for the University of Florida in Gainesville, Florida. Before swimming in college, Bobby swam for Coach Fred Lewis on the Saint Petersburg Aquatics club team (also known as SPA), located in Saint Petersburg, Florida.

Career

Early career
At 14 years old, Finke broke the Florida Age Group State Championships (FLAGS) 800m freestyle meet record with a time of 8:25.20. He proceeded to break the 1500m freestyle meet record, dropping over 15 seconds, for a time of 15:56.82. Finke also won the USA Swimming Open Water Junior Nationals by finishing first of all swimmers under 18 years of age. Finke was finished seventh overall in a field that included both the pro open water swimmers as well as collegiate swimmers.

High school career
Finke graduated from Countryside High School in Clearwater, Florida, where he competed with his high school team. He also swam club for Saint Petersburg Aquatics, where he was coached by Fred Lewis. Finke accomplished much during his high school years. Finke became a Team USA World Championship qualifier at FINA in 2017, and a member of the USA Swimming National team. At the 2018 Phillips 66 National Championships Finke finished second in the 1,500-meter freestyle in 14:55.34. Finke posted the third-fastest time ever in the 1,500-meter freestyle at the 2018 Pan Pacific Championships with a mark of 14:48.79. He also became a two-time NISCA All-American and a two-time USA Swimming Scholastic All-America. Finke also was a state champion in several swimming events in Florida's Division 4A. Entering college, Finke was ranked the No. 18-ranked recruit overall, and No. 1 swimmer in the state of Florida for the 2018 class.

College career
Robert Finke swam for the University of Florida in Gainesville, Florida from 2018 to 2022. Finke helped the Florida Gators swimming and diving men's team at the University of Florida score lots of points in their 2019, 2020, and 2021 Conference Championship meets. Finke's college coach was Anthony Nesty. During his time at University of Florida, Finke earned a plethora of accolades. Some of these accolades are eleven-time All-American, 2020 All-SEC First Team, 2020 SEC Champion (1,650 Free), 2020 SEC Academic Honor Roll, 2019 SEC Champion (1,650 free and 400 IM), 2019 All-SEC First-Team, 2019 Co-SEC Freshmen Swimmer of the Year, 2019 SEC All-Freshman team, 2021 NCAA Champion in the 400yIM and the 1650y Freestyle and 2022 NCAA Champion in the 1650y Freestyle.  Finke turned professional following the 2022 NCAA Championships and has continued training at the University of Florida as a member of Florida's 'Pro Group' under Anthony Nesty

2020 Olympic Trials
The autumn before the 2020 Summer Olympics, in November 2020, Finke won the gold medal in the 1500 meter freestyle with a time of 15:09.14, the silver medal in the 800 meter freestyle with a 7:53.05, and the silver medal in the 400 meter individual medley with a 4:18.08 at the 2020 U.S. Open Swimming Championships. In June 2021, Finke became one of 53 swimmers named to represent the United States at the 2020 Tokyo Olympic Games. He qualified in both the men's 800 meter freestyle and 1500 metre freestyle, placing first in both events at the 2020 US Olympic Trials in Omaha, Nebraska.

2020 Summer Olympics

   

In his first Olympic event, Finke won the gold in the men’s 800m freestyle, setting a new American record with a time of 7:41.87. He also placed first in the men's 1500m freestyle with a time of 14:39:65, making him the first American man to win the event since 1984. In the finals of both events, Finke was behind with 50 meters to go, but made a last-minute surge to win. He swam the final 50 meters of the 1500 in just 25.78 seconds, more than a full second faster than any split by any other swimmer in the finals. It was also faster than any competitor's final lap in the men's 200m finals and more than half a second faster than the 26.39 seconds for his own final 50 meters in the 800m.

Records
Finke's time of 7:41.87 at the 2020 Olympic Games in the men's 800m freestyle was an American record.  He reset the record at the 2022 FINA World Championships with a time of 7:39.36. 

Also at the 2022 FINA World Championships, Finke broke the American record in the 1500m Freestyle with a time of 14:36.70. 

Finke also holds the U.S. Open record (the fastest time on U.S. soil) in the 800m Freestyle with his time of 7:43.32 from the 2022 Phillips 66 US International Team Trials. 

In the short course pool, Finke set the American record in the 1650y Freestyle with a time of 14:12.08 at the 2020 SEC Championships.

International championships

Personal bests

Awards and honors
 Golden Goggle Award Male Race of the Year: 2021 (800 meter freestyle at the 2020 Summer Olympics)

Personal life 
Finke was born in Tampa, Florida on November 6, 1999. Finke's mother Jeanne swam for Ball State, while his father Joe is a swim coach with Saint Petersburg Aquatics. Finke also has two older sisters: Autumn Skye Finke, who swam for the University of Florida, and Ariel Summer Finke, who swam for Florida State University and North Carolina State University.

References

External links
 
 
 Bobby Finke - Men's Swimming & Diving
 Bobby Finke Bio

1999 births
Living people
Place of birth missing (living people)
American male freestyle swimmers
Swimmers at the 2020 Summer Olympics
Olympic swimmers of the United States
Olympic gold medalists for the United States in swimming
Medalists at the 2020 Summer Olympics
World Aquatics Championships medalists in swimming
Florida Gators men's swimmers